Naawi-Oodena (Anishinaabemowin; English: "centre of the heart and community") is the largest urban reserve in Manitoba and in Canada.

Description 
Naawi-Oodena is a 64-hectare parcel of land located on the edge of Tuxedo and River Heights.

History 
The location was used by the Princess Patricia's Canadian Light Infantry until 2004. In 2007 the Treasury Board of Canada sought to sell the land to crown corporation Canada Lands Company, but were met with objections from First Nations who claimed a right to the land.

A September 2009 decision by a Canadian Federal Court judge blocked the government's plans, citing a lack of consultaiton with the First Nation's groups. The government appealed the court's decision, but lost the appeal in 2012. In 2015, Prime Minister Stephen Harper announced that the government would stop fighting and let the First Nations have the land. Demolition of their Kapyong Barracks started in 2018.

Legal ownership to seven First Nations in Treaty 1 territory occurred in 2019. The seven nations include Brokenhead, Long Plain, Peguis, Roseau River, Sagkeeng, Sandy Bay and Swan Lake First Nations.

Naawi-Oodena became the largest urban reserve in Manitoba and in Canada on December 16, 2022.

References 

Indian reserves in Manitoba